Night of the Living Dead is a live album by the American rock band Jackyl. The band's first live album, it was recorded on New Year's Eve 1995 at the Will Rogers Auditorium in Fort Worth, Texas. The album was released on February 13, 1996, by Mayhem Records.

Track listing 
All songs by Jesse Dupree unless otherwise noted.
"Intro/Push Comes to Shove" – 4:14
"Mental Masturbation" – 4:29
"Headed for Destruction" – 5:00
"I Stand Alone" – 3:47
"Rock-a-Ho" (Dupree, Jeff Worley, Chris Worley) – 5:16
"Deeper in Darkness" – 4:27
"Down on Me" – 4:33
"Dirty Little Mind" – 5:33
"Redneck Punk" (Honeycutt, J. Worley) – 3:41
"The Lumberjack" – 7:39

Band 
Jesse James Dupree – vocals, chainsaw
Jimmy Stiff – guitars
Jeff Worley – guitars
Tom Bettini – bass
Chris Worley – drums

References 

Jackyl albums
1996 live albums